A blue hole is a submarine cave or sinkhole. It may also refer to:

Water-filled holes

In the Bahamas 
 Blue Holes National Park, Andros, which claims 22 blue holes
 Dean's Blue Hole, Long Island
 Far Side Blue Hole, also known as Magical Blue Hole, Abaco Islands
 Lost Reel Blue Hole, Abaco Islands
 Nancy’s Blue Hole, near Coopers Town, Abaco
 Watling's Blue Hole on San Salvador Island

In Belize 
 Great Blue Hole on Lighthouse Reef
 Blue Hole National Park, inland near Belmopan, Cayo District

In the United States

In Arkansas 
 Blue Hole (Desha County, Arkansas), four lakes named Blue Hole in List of lakes in Desha County, Arkansas
 Blue Hole (Lafayette County, Arkansas), in List of lakes in Lafayette County, Arkansas
 Blue Hole (Lee County, Arkansas) in List of lakes in Lee County, Arkansas
 Blue Hole (Monroe County, Arkansas) in List of lakes in Monroe County, Arkansas

Elsewhere in the U.S. 
 Blue Hole (Big Pine Key), an abandoned rock quarry in the Florida Keys
 Blue Hole (Guam), outside the entrance to Apra Harbor
 Blue Hole (Hawaii), also known as Wailua Headwaters, the start of the North Folk of the Wailua River at Mount Waialeale on Kauai, Hawaii
 Blue Hole (New Jersey)
 Blue Hole (New Mexico), a cenóte and popular altitude scuba diving site
 Blue Hole (Castalia), in Castalia, Ohio 
 Blue Hole, the largest of the San Antonio Springs, Texas

Elsewhere 

Blue Hole (Red Sea) in Egypt
 Blue Hole, associated with the Inland Sea, Gozo on Malta, Italy
 Blue Holes (Palau), north of Blue Corner, Palau
 Nanda Blue Hole, also known as Jackie's Blue Hole, on Espiritu Santo, Vanuatu
 Virgin Blue Hole, south of Blue Corner, Palau
 Yongle Blue Hole, also known as Dragon Hole, in the Paracel Islands, China

Other
Bluehole, Inc. (formerly Bluehole Studio, Inc.), the developer of TERA, Devilian and PlayerUnknown's Battlegrounds.
Bluehole Interactive, the former name of En Masse Entertainment.
Bluehole, Kentucky, a postoffice
Blue Hole, a manga series by Yukinobu Hoshino